Catopyrops rita is a species of butterfly belonging to the lycaenid family described by Henley Grose-Smith in 1895. It is found in the Australasian realm and in the Indomalayan realm, crossing the Wallace line.

Subspecies
C. r. rita Ambon, Timor
C. r. bora  Eliot, 1956 Sulawesi
C. r. altijavana Toxopeus, 1930 Java

References

External links
 "Catopyrops Toxopeus, 1929" at Markku Savela's Lepidoptera and Some Other Life Forms

Catopyrops
Butterflies described in 1895